The Commonwealth Building is a 14-story,  commercial office tower in Portland, Oregon, United States. Located at 421 SW 6th Avenue between Washington and Harvey Milk Streets, it was designed by architect Pietro Belluschi and built between 1944 and 1948. The building was originally known as the Equitable Building and is noted as one of the first glass box towers ever built, pioneering many modern features and predating the more famous Lever House in New York City.

History

Construction on the building began in 1944, with it opening in 1948 as the Equitable Building. The building, which was built as the headquarters in Portland of the Equitable Savings and Loan Association, was originally intended to be 12 stories high but was later expanded to 14. It was the first tower to be sheathed in aluminum, the first to use double-glazed window panels, and was the first to be completely sealed and fully air-conditioned. In 1965, the building was renamed as the Commonwealth Building when the Equitable Center (now Unitus Plaza) opened, which was also designed by Pietro Belluschi.

The Commonwealth Building was added to the National Register of Historic Places (as the Equitable Building) in 1976. In 1980, the American Society of Mechanical Engineers (ASME) designated the Commonwealth Building as a National Historic Mechanical Engineering Landmark.  In 1982, the building was the recipient of the Twenty-five Year Award, of the American Institute of Architects. In 1993, Weston Investment Co. LLC bought the building for $1.9 million. Unico Properties and Cigna Realty Investors bought the building in 2007 from Weston for $27 million, and spent $7 million more on renovations to the structure. The building was sold again by Unico in 2013 for $41 million when Unico bought out Cigna. Unico sold the tower to KBS in 2016 for $69 million.

Features
Designed by noted Oregon architect Pietro Belluschi, the  tower is of the International Style. The 14-story, -tall glass box tower is constructed of sea-green glass and is sheathed in aluminum.

Designations and awards
The building is listed on the National Register of Historic Places, and is also designated as a National Historic Mechanical Engineering Landmark by the ASME. The ASME History & Heritage Committee bestowed this landmark status for the specific feature: the first large commercial building in the United States to pioneer the use of heat pumps for heating and cooling.

See also
Architecture of Portland, Oregon
400 SW Sixth Avenue

References

External links

Great Buildings Online: The Equitable Building
Building Oregon: Equitable Building

Skyscraper office buildings in Portland, Oregon
Pietro Belluschi buildings
National Register of Historic Places in Portland, Oregon
Office buildings completed in 1948
1948 establishments in Oregon
Southwest Portland, Oregon
Portland Historic Landmarks